Colin Roy Cook (born 11 January 1960) is an English former cricketer who played first-class cricket for Middlesex. He later worked as a cricket coach in Australia.

References

1960 births
Living people
English cricketers
Middlesex cricketers